Zachary Laoutides (born December 13, 1986) is an American actor, screenwriter and filmmaker from Chicago, Illinois. In 2014, he co-founded independent film company Ave Fenix Pictures, the first Latino film studio in Chicago and originator of an art house filmmaking style known as "la raza". Inspired by La raza cósmica, this technique involves working together with the urban youth in recreating their own stories, regardless of film background.

His first starring role was in the film Adiós Vaya con Dios (2014), which earned him nominations for Best Actor and Best Screenplay at the Bel Air Film Festival. He also wrote and acted in Ave Fenix Pictures' Arise from Darkness (2018), based on the story of psychic Lázaro Rubén Torres, and Black Ruby (2019), claimed to be the "first feature to be shot on an iPhone 7."

Early life
Laoutides was born in 1986 in Chicago where he studied media and journalism. He spent his early years working in community outreach and introducing the performing arts to youth at risk. He resides in Chicago and is still active in community outreach working with Mónica Esmeralda León.

He is of Sephardic, Greek, Turkish and Slovenian heritage. Laoutides surname originates from the Arabic musical instrument oud; his paternal grandmother's family was from the Aegean Islands and the Biblical town of Smyrna, the Mizrahim Sephardi-proper communities of Turkey modern day Izmir. His Eastern European ancestry were ethnic minorities from the Austrian Empire and Russia Empire; Slovenian with some Polish and Scandinavian. His Jewish heritage traces back to Levite rabbinical families Halevi and Benveniste of the 11th to the 15th century in Barcelona. His background includes Moroccan Jewish, Indian Jewish and distant Latino roots from his father’s grandmother

Laoutides holds three nationalities, namely American, Mexican, and Israeli.

Career
Laoutides's first role was in Adiós Vaya con Dios, released worldwide by Indican Pictures on January 19, 2016. Laoutides starred in the film and wrote the screenplay while living in an urban Latino neighborhood, about a half white and half Mexican gang member trying to leave the barrio. Adiós Vaya con Dios was the first movie to use real gangs and streets artists. Laoutides was nominated as Best Actor and Best Screenplay writer at the Bel Air Film Festival where Adiós Vaya con Dios earned an Official Selection and Runner-up for Best Audience Feature Film.

He was also the finalist out of Chicago for Simon Fuller's XIX Entertainment nationwide talent search for new actors.

Laoutides was a musician on the Adiós Vaya con Dios soundtrack, composing and producing several songs. The movie was first to integrate a British and Mexican rock soundtrack over a Latino urbanized film.

In 2014 Laoutides co-founded Ave Fenix Pictures with Mónica Esmeralda León. Ave Fenix Pictures is the first Latino film studio in Chicago.

In 2016 Laoutides wrote and starred in Arise from Darkness, an official selection at Film Invasion L.A. based on true events in the early life of psychic Lázaro Rubén Torres, who was declared clinically dead five times . Laoutides composed and produced several tracks for the movie's soundtrack. Laoutides was nominated for Best Screenplay and shared in the nominations for Best Feature Film and Best Director. The film received three four stars reviews from Examiner.com, Inquisitr, and The Levity Ball, with critics comparing Laoutides performance to the opening of Javier Bardem's character Anton Chigurh in No Country for Old Men (film). The film was ranked number one in the 10 Best Supernatural Horror Movies Of The Last Decade, Ranked According to IMDb Rating.

In 2017 Laoutides premiered the film Black Ruby at the London Independent Film Awards. The company claimed it was the first to be shot with an iPhone 7. He earned nine nominations in London and Rome. Laoutides also changed his eye color, skin tone, and hair color for his role in the movie. His performance was compared with Montgomery Clift and Marlon Brando.

The Los Angeles Film Forum Awards critics called him "the best natural independent actor of 2018 and a master at subtlety." He was named one of the Top Indie actors to look for in 2019.

Laoutides being referred as a “method actor”, whose schooling was in journalism and sees acting as an extension using research to create his characters. He was compared to a young independent dark version of Ryan Gosling at the Los Angeles Film Festival.

In September 2020, Laoutides was cast along with Jaime Zevallos and Alexander James Rodriguez in the upcoming film "Where Sweet Dreams Die." The movie completed shooting in Chicago and New York in March of 2022.

Filmography

References

External links

 
 
 Zachary Laoutides on Facebook
 Zachary Laoutides on Instagram

American people of Greek descent
21st-century American male actors
Male actors from Chicago
American male film actors
1986 births
Living people
Hispanic and Latino American male actors
American people of Greek-Jewish descent
American people of Sephardic-Jewish descent
American people of Turkish descent
American Sephardic Jews
Jewish American male actors
21st-century American Jews